Humans of Planet Earth is a project aimed to regroup 100 photographers from 100 locations around the world, in an effort to capture 10000 portraits of people. The project was initiated by a New Zealand-American Brandon Van Slyke, in an effort to gain a perspective of the planet and its people, particularly if it contrasts from stereotypical prevailing media portrayals. The initiative was inspired by the Humans of New York (HONY) blog, an attempt to document people from New York City.

The portraits and stories are shared on a Facebook page, in addition to the main website. Each portrait comes with a story - oftentimes a quote, extracted from the conversation the photographer had with the subject. The project currently includes 89 photographers from over 60 locations around the world. Most photographers manage their own Humans of project for a local area, including Montreal, Austin, Texas, Indonesia and Milan.

References

External links 
 Main site

Photoblogs
Photography exhibitions